A day shift is a shift in shift work.

Day Shift may also refer to:

 Day Shift (film), 2022 Netflix vampire movie starring Jamie Foxx
 Day Shift (Irish TV programme), sister programme to the Irish TV music programme Night Shift
 Revenue Retrievin': Day Shift, 2010 album

See also

 
 
 Night Shift (disambiguation)
 Shift (disambiguation)
 Day (disambiguation)